Dead Space was the only album released by the Omaha, Nebraska based rock band Slowdown Virginia. Distributed by Lumberjack Records (which later became Saddle Creek) in 1994, copies of the album spread locally on compact disc. Slowdown Virginia broke up shortly after the release of the album, with three of the four members forming the band Cursive a month later.

Track listing
Supernova '75
Dave Mustang
Vicki My Sick Gills
Whipping Stick
Martian Landing
Dave Mustang Reprise
Breaking Branches
Blame
Cross-Eyed
Fork in My Socket
Another Slip
Untitled
Juan Pablo Shoe

References

1994 albums